Alexander Maes (Ekeren, 1 April 1901 – Zwijndrecht, 30 December 1973) was a Belgian bicycle racer.

(Johannes) Alexander Maes, son of Lambertus Maes and Anna Maria Teunen, was a professional cyclist from 1924 to 1933. He competed in track cycling (6 days of Ghent and 6 days of Brussels) and road bicycle racing. During his professional career he had 9 individual victories, most of them during sprint finish races (Zwijndrecht in 1927, Lebbeke and Aalter in 1928 and the Grote Velokoers of Zottegem in 1930). His main successes include victories of Paris–Menin (1925), Circuit de l'Arvor (1927), Schaal Sels Merksem (1928), Grote 1-MeiPrijs (1928) and the inaugural Nationale Sluitingsprijs in 1929.
 
He participated twice in the Tour of Flanders (24th in 1926 and 28th in 1927).

After his cycling career he owned a sports pub in the vicinity of the Sportpaleis in Antwerp.

Major results
1925
 1st Paris–Menen
1928
 1st Schaal Sels
 1st Grote 1-MeiPrijs
 4th Kampioenschap van Vlaanderen
1929
 1st Nationale Sluitingprijs

References

External links 

 Alexander Maes in the database of Wielersite.net

Belgian male cyclists
1901 births
1973 deaths
People from Ekeren